Abdoulaye Sarr (born 9 December 1947) is a Senegalese hurdler. He competed in the 110 metres hurdles at the 1972, 1976 and the 1980 Summer Olympics. Sarr won a bronze medal in the 110 metres hurdles at the 1973 All-Africa Games.

References

1947 births
Living people
Athletes (track and field) at the 1972 Summer Olympics
Athletes (track and field) at the 1976 Summer Olympics
Athletes (track and field) at the 1980 Summer Olympics
Senegalese male hurdlers
Olympic athletes of Senegal
African Games bronze medalists for Senegal
African Games medalists in athletics (track and field)
Place of birth missing (living people)
Athletes (track and field) at the 1973 All-Africa Games